This refers to individual mountains named Rocky Mountain in Georgia. For other individual mountains named Rocky Mountain, see Rocky Mountain. For peaks or mountains named Rocky Knob, see Rocky Knob (disambiguation). For the mountain range in western North America, see Rocky Mountains.

Rocky Mountain is the name of nine distinct mountains located in the North Georgia mountains that are spread among six different counties in Georgia

Fannin County
 Rocky Mountain, elevation 3,080, is located west of Gaddistown, less than two miles (3 km) west of the Union County border.

Gilmer County

Rocky Mountain is located to the north of the Rich Mountain Wilderness and east of Lucius. The Benton MacKaye Trail passes over the summit of Rocky Mountain.

Lumpkin County
DeSoto Falls, one of the most popular waterfalls in Georgia, is on the southern flank of the mountain. Rocky Mountain is located within the boundaries of the Chattahoochee National Forest.

Rabun County
Bad Creek and Worse Creek, two tributaries of the Chatooga River have their headwaters on the eastern side of Rocky Mountain. The stream that feeds Cascade Falls begins in the southern side of Rocky Mountain.

Towns County
 Rocky Mountain, elevation , is located on the Appalachian Trail along the boundary between Towns and White counties.

Union County
  Rocky Mountain is located south of Brasstown Bald, Georgia's tallest peak.  It is within the boundaries of the Brasstown Wilderness.  A peak called Rocky Knob, elevation , is  found directly south of the mountain's peak, on a spur or ridge of the mountain that is oriented north-south.

 Rocky Mountain is located about five miles (8 km) north of Suches, about halfway between Baxter to the west and Blood Mountain to the east.

 Rocky Mountain, elevation , is located about 1 miles northwest of Baxter, less than 1/2 mile east of the Union/Fannin county line.

White County

References